Raju Jeyamohan (born 2 July 1991) is an Indian actor, television host and model in the Indian film industry, who has worked predominantly in Tamil television shows and films. Raju made his debut in the movie Natpuna Ennanu Theriyuma in the year 2019. He has also acted in various serials including Kana Kaanum Kalangal, 'Kalloori Salai', 'Aandaal Azhagar', and 'Saravanan Meenatchi' on Vijay Television. In 2022, he emerged as the winner of the Tamil reality television show Bigg Boss (Tamil season 5).

Personal life 
Raju was born in Tirunelveli, Tamil Nadu. He did his B.Sc. in Visual Communication from PSG College of Arts and Science in Coimbatore. He married his long-time girlfriend Tarika in October 2020. Before making his appearance on television, he has done many modeling covers and photo shoots.

Career
Jeyamohan started his career by first appearing in the second season of the Coming of age television drama Kana Kaanum Kaalangal in 2012 playing one of the lead roles in the show. Raju was also supposed to be part of Vijay's film Nanban in 2012, however due to personal issues he rejected the offer of the film.

From 2013 to 2016, he portrayed Saravanan's PA in Star Vijay's  Saravanan Meenatchi Season 2. One year later Raju also acted in the family drama Naam Iruvar Namakku Iruvar playing the role as Kathiresan.

Raju also acted in a few list of films such as Natpuna Ennanu Theriyuma (2019), Murungakkai Chips (2021) and Don (2022).

In January 2022, he emerged as the title winner in the reality show Bigg Boss (Tamil season 5)  .

He also appeared in the celebration show called Bigg Boss 5 Kondattam as a guest and Start Music season 3. Raju also announced that he is taking a break from acting in television and focus more on acting in his upcoming films.

In late 2022, he also started hosting a sketch comedy and chat show called Raju Vootla Party featuring him as the main host and character in the show which aired on Star Vijay.

Filmography

Film

All films are in Tamil unless otherwise noted.

Television

References

External links 

Living people
Tamil male television actors
Tamil male actors
Male actors in Tamil cinema
People from Tamil Nadu
Bigg Boss (Tamil TV series) contestants
Big Brother (franchise) winners
1991 births